Silvius abdominalis is a species of horse fly in the family Tabanidae.

Distribution
Central and Southern Europe.

References

Tabanidae
Insects described in 1954
Diptera of Europe
Taxa named by Giovanni Antonio Scopoli